is a Japanese paperfolder and origami theorist who is known for his geometrically innovative models. He is particularly famous for his series of fourfold symmetry "roses", all based on a twisting maneuver that allows the petals to seem to curl out from the center of the flower.  Kawasaki also teaches mathematics at Sasebo Technical Junior College.

Kawasaki was the first to develop the technique of iso-area folding, which allows the folder to end up with each side of the paper displayed in equal amounts. It consists of building a mirror-symmetrical crease pattern and then collapsing it to find a finished form, usually a geometric shape such as a cube. He also discovered and proved that with any given flat point in an origami model, the sum of alternating angles is always equal to 180 degrees, a result now known as Kawasaki's theorem.

Publications
Origami^6, American Math Society, (2015)
The Greatest Dream Origami, Asahi Press, (2009)

Resources
Kunihiko Kasahara and Toshie Takahama, Origami for the Connoisseur. Japan Publications.

External links
Instructions for folding Toshikazu Kawasaki's Rose

1955 births
Living people
Origami artists
People from Kurume